Peter Youngren, also known as Peter Ljunggren, is a Canadian Christian evangelist, pastor, and author. He is the founder of  World Impact Ministries (WIM), an international Christian organization with outreaches in more than 100 nations. In recognition of his success in Gospel ministry in non-Christian nations, Ministry Today listed Youngren as one of the most influential international evangelists of the 20th century.

Education
Born in 1954 in Sweden as Peter Ljunggren into a missionary family, Youngren relocated to Canada as a teenager. He attended Zion Bible College in Rhode Island, pursuing further education years thereafter at the Florida Christian University, where he obtained a Doctorate of Philosophy in 2001 and an Honorary Degree of Christian Doctor of Philosophy in Business Administration in 2002.

Personal life
Youngren's third wife, Taina Kuusiluoma, assists him in his ministries.

Festival History
Youngren is known for his Friendship Festivals, having conducted them in over 60 nations during the last 35 years. Some of the Friendship Festivals have gathered as many as 600,000 people in a single service - with 16 million new believers having received followup.

In 1990 Youngren held a stadium crusade in the Soviet Union.

In 1991, around 200,000 people attended Youngren's crusade in the Central Square in Sofia, Bulgaria.

Professional life
Youngren founded World Impact Ministries (WIM) in 1976, while still a student in Rhode Island. Ordained in 1982, he started working in television in 1985. In 1988, he opened the World Impact Bible Institute (WIBI), a small Christian college that began in Niagara Falls, Ontario.

Youngren established the Open Bible Faith Fellowship in 1994. In 2003 Youngren stepped down as president of the Open Bible Faith Fellowship when it was discovered that during his second marriage to RoxAnne Rutkey he had fathered a child in an affair with one of the women in his Niagara congregation. The organization has subsequently severed ties.

In 2000, Youngren and his son, Peter Karl Youngren, established the Toronto International Celebration Church. The church subsequently became the base of the WIBI.

In 2005, Youngren founded Way of Peace, a ministry focused on Israel and the Middle East. 

In 2009, Youngren purchased Canada's The Christian Channel, relaunching it as "Grace TV", a name it retained until his partnership with Daystar in 2013 led to its rebranding as Daystar Canada. Currently, his You Are Loved telecast is aired throughout the week across the United States, Canada, India, Indonesia and the Middle East.

In 2011, Finnish religious organization Evankeliumi Kaikkiin Maihin complained to Finnish police that, after they had suspended Youngren from some activities for his separation from his second wife, Youngren had misappropriated their confidential mailing list and were using it themselves. Youngren countered that he had rights to the list, which he said he had compiled from his own work. In 2013, a Finnish court fined Youngren's third wife Tania Youngren, as WIM's Finnish representative, for using the list without right.

Books 
 My Muslim Friends, Celebrate Publications (2006) 
The Faith That Works, Graceworld (2015) 
 Great faith for Great Miracles, Celebrate Jesus International (2004) 
 One Sacred Hour, Dominion Media Productions (1994)
 The Sign, Dominion Media Productions (1996) 
 You Can Receive Healing from God. Dominion Media (2000) ASIN B0015T143C
 Salvation: God's Gift to You, Dominion Media Productions (1994) ASIN 1895868041
 Fire from Heaven, Dominion Media Productions (1982) 
 Blood-Bought Victory, Dominion Media Productions, (1994)

Notes

External links

Official Websites
 World Impact Ministries, Official Website
 Toronto International Celebration Church, Official Website
 World Impact Bible Institute, Official Website
 Grace TV

External Coverage
 Religious Faiths Collide in Russia; Orthodox Church Frets, Backs Curbs on Missionaries
 RELIGION-KENYA: "MIRACLE WORKERS" OFFER HOPE TO THE HOPELESS
 Ultra-Hindu activists target foreign missionaries
 Religion Returns to Russia, With a Vengeance

1954 births
Living people
Canadian television evangelists
Youngen, Peter
Canadian clergy
Swedish Christian religious leaders